Tenacibaculum holothuriorum is a Gram-negative and aerobic bacterium from the genus of Tenacibaculum which has been isolated from the sea cucumber Apostichopus japonicus from Xiapu in China.

References 

Flavobacteria
Bacteria described in 2015